Baragwanath is a Cornish language surname originating in west Cornwall in the UK. As a result of emigration, members of the Baragwanath family can now be found in South Africa, the UK, Australia, the US, and New Zealand. In Johannesburg, Gauteng, there is a hospital whose name is derived from a local storekeeper, John Albert Baragwanath: the Chris Hani Baragwanath Academic Hospital, Soweto. This hospital has over 3,000 beds.

It is particularly common in Penwith and is recorded as early as the year 1590 (John Baragwanath 1590 to 1660 Married to Eleanor Baragwanath survived by their 8 children, John, Emblem, Elizabeth, Catherine, Joan, Mary, Jane & Richard.)

In Australia, the Baragwanath Transform and the fossil plant Baragwanathia were named after the geologist William Baragwanath (died 1966).

Notable people with the surname 

 Judith Baragwanath (born 1951), New Zealand writer
 Minnie Baragwanath, disability advocate from New Zealand
 Nicholas Baragwanath, British music theorist, musicologist and pianist
 William Baragwanath (1878–1966), Australian surveyor, geologist and public servant
 David Baragwanath, New Zealand lawyer and jurist

References in other media
 The song by Australian band TISM, "Mr. Ches Baragwanath, State Auditor–General", from their controversial EP Australia the Lucky Cunt deals with the then Auditor-General of Victoria, Ches Baragwanath.

References
 Baragwanath History in South Africa The Baragwanath family history in South Africa.
 Baragwanath Family of Towednack, Cornwall Baragwanath Family of Towednack, Cornwall.

External links

Chris Hani Baragwanath Hospital
William Baragwanath
William Baragwanath biography

Cornish-language surnames